Hot and sour soup is a popular example of Sichuan cuisine. Similar versions are found in Henan province, near Beijing, and in Henan cuisine itself, where it may also be known as hulatang or "pepper hot soup" (胡辣汤). Also popular in Southeast Asia, India, Pakistan and the United States, it is a flexible soup which allows ingredients to be substituted or added depending on availability. For example, the American-Chinese version can be  thicker as it commonly includes corn starch, whilst in Japan, sake is often added.

North America

United States
Soup preparation may use chicken or pork broth, or may be meat-free. Common basic ingredients in the American Chinese version include bamboo shoots, toasted sesame oil, wood ear, cloud ear fungus, day lily buds, vinegar, egg, corn starch, and white pepper.  Other ingredients include button mushrooms, shiitake mushrooms,  or straw mushrooms and small slices of tofu skin. It is thicker than the Chinese cuisine versions due to the addition of cornstarch.

East Asia

China
"Hot and sour soup" is claimed variously by the cuisines of Beijing and Sichuan as a regional dish. The Chinese hot and sour soup is usually meat-based, and often contains ingredients such as day lily buds, wood ear fungus, bamboo shoots, and tofu, in a broth that is sometimes flavored with pork blood. Sometimes, the soup would also have carrots and pieces of pork. It is typically made hot (spicy) by white pepper, and sour by Zhenjiang vinegar.

Japan 
Japanese hot and sour soup is made with the traditional dashi broth flavored with vinegar, soy sauce and sake, and may include shiitake mushrooms, tofu, bamboo shoots and red chilis. The soup is thickened with eggs and potato starch.

South Asia

India
In India, this soup is made with red and green chillies, ginger, carrots, snow peas, tofu, soy sauce, rice vinegar and a pinch of sugar. It is viewed in India as being a Chinese soup.

Pakistan
Hot and sour soup is usually made in Pakistan with chicken, carrots, cabbage, chillies, corn flour, eggs, vinegar, soy sauce and salt. It may also contain bean sprout and capsicum.

Southeast Asia

Cambodia
 is a Cambodian sour soup flavored with lemon, chilis, prawns and/or shrimp.  One of the most popular sour soups in Cambodia, it is eaten most often on special occasions.

 is another common hot and sour soup that originated in the Mekong Delta region. It is made with fish, usually mudfish, walking catfish or tilapia, that has first been fried or broiled then added to the broth. Chicken may also be substituted. The ingredients which give the stew its characteristic flavor may vary depending on what is available locally to the cook. Possible ingredients include various combinations of pineapple, tomato, ngo gai, fried garlic, papaya, lotus root, Asian basil and Bird's eye chili.

Thailand
Tom yum is a Thai soup flavored with lemon grass, lime, kaffir lime leaves, galangal, fish sauce and chilis.

Sour curry is a soup-like spicy and sour Thai curry.

Philippines

There are numerous sour soup dishes in the Philippines using souring agents that range from tamarind to unripe mangoes, guavas, butterfly tree leaves (alibangbang), citruses (including the native calamansi and biasong), santol, bilimbi (kamias or iba), gooseberry tree fruits (karmay), binukaw fruits (also batuan), and libas fruits, among others. Most of these dishes are included in the umbrella term sinigang, but there are other regional dishes like sinampalukan, pinangat na isda, cansi, and linarang which are cooked slightly differently. The dishes are related to the paksiw class of dishes which are soured using vinegar.

Vietnam
Canh chua (literally "sour soup"), a sour soup indigenous to the Mekong River region of southern Vietnam. It is typically made with fish from the Mekong River or shrimp, pineapple, tomatoes (and sometimes also other vegetables), and bean sprouts, and flavored with tamarind and the lemony-scented herb ngò ôm (Limnophila aromatica). When made in style of a hot pot, canh chua is called lẩu canh chua.

See also

 Egg drop soup
 List of Chinese dishes
 List of Chinese soups
 List of soups
 List of vegetable soups
 Hot and sour noodles

References

American Chinese cuisine
Beijing cuisine
Cambodian soups
Chinese soups
Indian soups and stews
Laotian soups
Philippine soups
Sichuan cuisine
Thai soups
Vietnamese soups
Japanese soups and stews